A hood ornament (or bonnet ornament in Commonwealth English), also called, motor mascot, or car mascot is a specially crafted model which symbolizes a car company like a badge, located on the front center portion of the hood. It has been used as an adornment nearly since the inception of automobiles.

Origin
According to the author of A History of Cars written for youth, the first "hood ornament" was a sun-crested falcon (to bring good luck) mounted on the Egyptian pharaoh Tutankhamun's chariot.

In the early years, automobiles had their radiator caps outside the hood and on top of the grille which also served as an indicator of the temperature of the engine's coolant fluid. The Boyce MotoMeter Company was issued a patent in 1912 for a radiator cap that incorporated a thermometer that was visible to the driver with a sensor that measured the heat of the water vapor, rather than the water itself. This became a useful gauge for the driver because many early engines did not have water pumps, but a circulation system based on the "thermo-syphon" principle as in the Ford Model T.

The "exposed radiator cap became a focal point for automobile personalization."

Hood ornaments were popular in the 1920s, 1930s, 1940s, and 1950s, with many automakers fitting them to their vehicles. During the 1920s, advertisements for Mercedes-Benz emphasized their "star" hood ornament as representing the "world-famous product of the oldest automobile works in the world" and as the ultimate symbol of luxury.

Moreover, a market developed in the supply accessories to those who wanted to add an ornament or car mascot to their automobile. These were a way to express the owner's love of their car or customizing to express individuality. Most of these companies went out of business, with only Louis Lejeune Ltd. in England surviving. Sculptors such as Bazin, Paillet, Sykes, Renevey, and Lejeune created detailed sculptures in miniature, like statuettes.

Legal restrictions
Restrictions to the fitting of ornaments on the front of vehicles have been introduced in some jurisdictions. Projecting decorative designs on the hood may increase the risk of injury to pedestrians in the case of an accident.

Regulations introduced in the United States for the 1968 model year vehicles meant the disappearance of fixed stand-up hood ornaments, as well as spinner wheel protrusions. Later versions featured flexibly mounted (spring-loaded) stand-up hood ornaments designed to fold without breaking on impact, such as on the 1974 AMC Ambassador, 1980 Ford Thunderbird and on the 1986 Jeep Wagoneer (SJ).

In the European Union, since 1974 all new cars have had to conform to a European directive on vehicle exterior projections. The Mercedes-Benz and many other ornaments were designed with a spring mount to fold on impact. For aftermarket ornaments, breakaway nylon fixings are available that comply with EC Directive 74/483.

The ornaments have been moved downward from hood to grille

Branding

Many automakers wanted their own emblems displayed on their vehicles' hoods, and Boyce Motormeter accommodated them with corporate logos or mascots, as well as numerous organizations that wanted custom cap emblems to identify their members. The company had over 300 such customers at one time during the mid-1920s, for car, truck, tractor, boat, airplane, and motorcycle manufacturers, and in 1927, had 1,800 employees in six countries: U.S., England, Canada, Australia, France, and Germany. The hundreds of motor vehicle manufacturers before 1929 meant many customers for their customized emblems.

Brand identification continues to be important "as firms try to distinguish their company's cookie-cutter SUV, sedan or pick-up truck from another company's cookie-cutter SUV, sedan or pick-up truck merely with a hood ornament or a name on the bumper."

Examples
Along with the grille, the hood ornament is often a distinctive styling element, and many marques use it as their primary brand identifier.

Examples of hood ornaments include:
 Archer on Pierce-Arrow cars
 Ottawa leader Pontiac on Pontiac automobiles
 Crest and wreath on Cadillac cars
 Letter "B" with wings on Bentley cars
 Ball with wings on Horch cars
 Leaping jaguar on Jaguar Cars
 Lion rampant on Peugeot cars
 Marlin jumping out of water mounted in a "sight" on AMC's fastback
 Rocket on Oldsmobile cars
 Rocky Mountain big horn ram's head on Dodge cars and trucks
 Spirit of Ecstasy on Rolls-Royce Motor Cars
Stork on Hispano-Suiza cars
 Three-pointed star surrounded by a circle on Mercedes-Benz sedans and wagons
 Trishields on Buick cars

Additionally, many models such as Buick's Regal, the Chevrolet Impala, and Chrysler's Cordoba each had their own unique emblems and accompanying distinctive standup hood ornaments.

The importance of design
The radiator cap was transformed into an art form and became a way of individualizing the car, "representing a company's vision of the automobile", or "speaking volumes about the owner" of the vehicle.

Materials used in manufacturing
Hood ornaments are usually cast in brass, zinc, or bronze and finished in a chrome plated finish. During the years when chrome plate was unavailable, they were plated in either silver or nickel. Some also incorporated other materials, such as plastic, bakelite, or colored glass. The 1950 Ford Custom DeLuxe hood ornament was molded in Plexiglas. Others incorporated a light bulb for illumination at night. Pontiac featured a lighted Indian-head hood ornament through 1955 when it was replaced by the flying V design.

The best-known glass mascots were made by René Lalique in France. Other sellers or producers of glass mascots include Sabino in France, Red Ashay in England, and Persons Majestic in the U.S. The latter two had their products made in Czechoslovakia. The Lalique company, like Louis Lejeune, is one of the few survivors from this era of motoring.

Collectibility
Some hood ornaments are attractive for more than the car's owners such as the red-white-and-blue golden lion crests that were on the hoods of 1950 Fords that children took to decorate their hats, belts, or bicycles. The company solved the problem by offering a free miniature crest to all the kids that wrote letters requesting one.

There is a collector's market for hood ornaments and car mascots.

References

External links

 
 
 
 

Automotive accessories
Collecting